Nothobranchius cooperi is a species of brightly colored seasonal killifish in the family Nothobranchiidae. This species is endemic to seasonal freshwater habitats in northern Zambia. It is known from temporary pools and swamps on the floodplains of the Mansa and Lufimba river systems in Zambia.

Sources

Links
 Nothobranchius cooperi on WildNothos 

cooperi
Fish described in 2017
Fish of Zambia
Endemic fauna of Zambia